Diamanter is a 2001 album by Swedish dansband Arvingarna.

Track listing
Intro - 0:53
Om du vill ha mig - 3:32
Ta mig till det blå - 4.28
Diamanter - 3:38
Madelene - 3:37
En man för dig - 3:18
Tro mig - 3.31
Sjunde himlen - 3:03
There's som Many Things - 2.53
Rakt in i hjärtat - 3:07
Jag skall ta med dig till havet - 3.29
Marie - 3:23
Du fick mig att öppna mina ögon - 3:09
Det finns ingen mening - 3:32
Twilight - 3.18
Sommarhimmel - 3.31

Charts

References

2001 albums
Arvingarna albums